Margrit Zimmermann (7 August 1927 – 23 February 2020) was a Swiss pianist, composer, conductor and music educator.

She studied piano there under Jeanne Bovet and composition under Walter Furrer. Later she studied under Denise Bidal and Alfred Cortot in Lausanne. She continued her education at the École Normale de Musique de Paris, studying composition under Arthur Honegger, and graduated in piano in 1952.

Zimmermann trained as a conductor under Ewald Körner in Bern and took master courses from Igor Markevitch in Monte Carlo and Hans Swarowski in Ossiach. She taught music for several years and worked as a conductor. She studied composition with Aurelio Maggioni and Umberto Rotondi at the Giuseppe Verdi Conservatory in Milan, where she received her diploma in composition in 1978. She also studied conducting under Umberto Cattini.

In 1973, Margrit Zimmermann established an orchestra in Bern. She received the Jubiläumsstiftung der Schweizerischen Bankgesellschaft award in 1986, female composer awards from the city of Unna and the city of Kassel, and an award from the Japan International League of Artists in Tokyo in 1989.

She died in Bern, Switzerland.

Works
Zimmermann has composed works for chamber orchestra, voice and symphonic orchestra, ballet music, solo works for piano, string and wind instruments, and guitar, including:

Drei Lieder, op. 5 (1977–78)
Musica per nove archi, op. 17 (1977)
Suoni, op. 4 (1978)
Quartetto d'archi Nr. 1, op. 7 (string quartet N°1, op.7) (1979–1982)
Introduzione, Allegro, Episodio I - II - III, Alla marcia et Fugato.
Introduzione e Allegro, op. 12 (1979) Symphony for large orchestra
Der Politiker: Braucht der Mensch Freiheit?, op. 6 (1979) for one speaking voice, double bass and piano
Musica, op. 8 (1980) for violoncello and piano
Per Sei, op. 9 (1980) for flute, violin, viola, violoncello, piano and timpani
Quartetto d'archi Nr. 2, op. 11 (1980)
Quartetto d'archi Nr. 3, "Il giuoco", op. 16 (1981)
Black Box, op. 19 (1981–82) for oboe, clarinet, horn and bassoon
Capriccio, op. 19 (1982) for one voice and piano
Duetto, op. 26 (1982) for violoncello and guitar
Spiegelungen des Tages, op. 34 (1984/90)
Fantasia duetto, op. 29 (1984) for flute and guitar
Pezzi Brevi, op. 30 (1984) for guitar
Bianchi-Neri, op. 36 (1984) for piano
Pensieri, op. 31 (1984) 3 sonnets for tenor, guitar and flute
Plis, op. 37 (1985) Symphony for tenor and solo instruments
Dialog, op. 38 (1985) for flute and piano
Fuori Dentro, op. 70 (1985) for piano
Visione, op. 32 (1985) for guitar and piano
Sonate für Violine solo, op. 33 (sonata for violin solo, op. 33) (1985)
Pizzicato, op. 68 (1985) for violin
Orphische Tänze, op. 43 (1986) Quintet for flute, clarinet, viola, violoncello and piano
Aus dem Tagebuch einer Prinzessin, op. 44 (1986) for piano
Rapsodie, op. 41 (1986) for solo violin, guitar, 2 violins, viola, violoncello and double bass
L'illusione per violoncello solo, op. 42 (1986)
Gehen/Sucht/Morgen, op. 45 (1986) Trio for alto voice, violoncello and piano
Panta Rhei, op. 39 (1987) for violin solo, soprano, female choir and organ
Pianorama, op. 59 (1987) Concert for piano and string orchestra
Die Gestundete Zeit, op. 52 (1987) for voice and instrumental ensemble
Piano Time, op. 46 (1987) Toccata for piano solo
Cloccachorda, op. 40 (1987) for piano
Quadriga, op. 51 (1987) for piano
Spuren innerer Kreise, op. 53 (1988) for 16 voices
Murooji per chitarra solo, op. 57 (1988)
Alle 7 Jahre, op. 58 (1989) for soprano and piano
Rhapsodie For Two, op. 52 (1990) for clarinet and piano
Wo sich berühren Raum und Zeit, op. 60 (1990) for nine female voices
Triptychon, op. 58 (1990) for trombone and organ
Serenade, op. 62 (1992) for flute and piano
In Urbis Honorem, op. 61 (1992) for mixed choir and orchestra, after texts from "Das Jahr der Stadt" by Georg Schaeffner.
Incontro, op. 93 (1992) Duettino for flute and euphonium
Gesänge der Liebe, op. 102 (1994–1995) for soprano and piano
Italiam! Italiam!, op. 106 (1995) for one speaking voice, clarinet and military drum
OMEGA: dentro fuori, op. 57 (1996)for flute (with string effects in the piano)
Capriccio, op. 63 (1998–1999) for piano
Il Flauto magico, op. 77, 1 (1999) for flute
Allegro Giocoso, op. 100 (2000) for piano
Esperanza, op. 102 (2000) for flute

References

1927 births
2020 deaths
20th-century classical composers
École Normale de Musique de Paris alumni
Women classical composers
Jewish composers
Swiss Jews
Milan Conservatory alumni
People from Bern
Swiss classical composers
Swiss music educators
Swiss pianists
Swiss women pianists
Women music educators
20th-century women composers
20th-century Swiss composers
20th-century women pianists